Rajani Kannepalli Kanth is a professor, economist, philosopher, and  social thinker. Though born in India, he is a US citizen and has resided overseas for most of his life. His major research interests lie in the fields of Economics, Social Theory and Policy, and Women's Issues. His works have received positive endorsements from iconic intellectuals such as Ravi Batra, Roy Bhaskar, Noam Chomsky, Geoff Harcourt, Robert Heilbroner, John M. Hobson, Jonathan Joseph, Tony Lawson, Ali Mazrui, John McMurtry, Roger Owen, Warren Samuels, Gayatri Chakravorty Spivak,  Paul Sweezy, and Immanuel Wallerstein. He has, across plus-three decades, taught in the areas of Anthropology, Sociology, Political Science, History, Economics, and Philosophy. He currently serves as the Trustee of the World Peace Congress that he founded in Salt Lake City, Utah, in 2007.  He has also served as an advisor to the United Nations in New York, aside from being on the faculty of major universities around the world.

Life and education 
He grew up in Madras, India. He has studied at various institutions in India and overseas, such as St. George's College, Loyola College, the Delhi School of Economics, Columbia University, and the New School for Social Research. He holds a bachelor's degree in Economics/Statistics/Politics, a Master's in Sociology, a second Master's in Economics, and a Ph.D. in Economics.

He has been married, and divorced, twice. He has  four daughters, two  from each marriage, all living in the USA.

The World Peace Congress 

He founded the World Peace Congress in Salt Lake City in 2007, holding its first Congress. It has since held two further Congresses – in India, and in Thailand. He continues to serve as its Trustee. A poem of his, set to backdrop music, named Millennium, offers  his rationale for launching the World Peace Congress.

Academic career 

He commenced his academic career teaching political sociology at the newly inaugurated Jawaharlal Nehru University, after obtaining a master's degree in social anthropology from the Delhi School of Economics, in New Delhi in 1971. In 1974, he attended Columbia University, from which he transferred to the New School for Social Research, New York in 1975. In 1979, he taught as Economics Faculty at the UN International School in New York, and at St. John’s University, as well as serving as a teaching fellow at the New School for Social Research. That same Year he earned his second master's, in economics, whilst also serving as a research associate at Columbia University, following it up with a Ph.D. in economics in 1980. His Ph.D. thesis was published as a book titled Political Economy and Laissez-Faire in 1986. After a stint as economic advisor to the United Nations, at the UNFPA, and also the Centre for Transnational Corporations in New York, between 1979–1981, he returned to the academy, joining the State University of New York, at Purchase, where he taught from 1981–1985. From there on, he went on to accept positions in a multitude of Institutions: Providence College, the University of Utah, Oxford University, UK, the University of Bielefeld, Germany, University of Bremen, Germany, the University of Aarhus (Denmark), the University of New South Wales (Australia), the University of Technology, Australia, Wagner College, New York, the National University of Singapore, Duke University, the University of Massachusetts Amherst, Tufts University, Loras College, Washington College, Bard College, and Harvard University (where he served as a visiting scholar in Economics in 1998, Fellow in the Center for Middle Eastern Studies 2007–2010, associate of the Department of Anthropology 2010–2011, Fellow in the Department of Anthropology 2011–2014, visiting scholar in English 2014–2015) amongst others. In April–May 2012, he visited Jawaharlal Nehru University, India, as a Fellow of the Institute for Advanced Studies.

Major theories

Rajani Kanth's major philosophical theories include:

a) that Ricardian Economics was merely policy advocacy in theoretical guise,

b) that Economics is the crown jewel of the hegemonic ideology of Modernism,

c) that European Modernism, whose derivates are capitalism and socialism, is the real grey eminence that has crafted the alienated  misery of our epoch,

d) that we need to "break with the enlightenment" to escape the modernist cage,

e) that gender struggles far predate class and other struggles, with women's oppression being the original paradigm of power and domination, and define the "degree of civilization" of a societal form,

f) that men and women are distinct sub-species embodying a "paradigm of masculinity" and a "paradigm of femininity", respectively, correlated to violence and nurturance, that are basically instinctual in nature despite their cultural variation,

g) that we are, as hominids, basically tribal beings with clan and family being the surrogates for herd and pack in the animal world, of which we are a part,

h) that all our utopias founder on the rock of masculine drives for domination,

i) that only tribal society based on affective ties has managed to contain the predations of masculine drives within the healing matrix of kinship: and remains our best template of a modest amelioration.

Publications

Academic

Literary

Articles

Major lectures

Reception 

"Rajani K. Kanth and Eurocentrism: A Critique" by Nick Hostettler 

"A Voyage into America – Discovering the New Wretched of the Earth" by John M. Hobson 

"A review of Breaking With The Enlightenment: The Twilight of History and the Rediscovery of Utopia" by Alex Prichard

Awards and honors
He was honored with a Festschrift at the American Economic Association Meetings in Chicago, January 4, 2007.
He received a Curriculum Development Award at the University of Utah and a Rural Utah Research Award
on the Status of Utah Women in 1991/92.
He won a College Medal at Loyola College.

References

External links 
World Peace Congress

Harvard University people
American male writers of Indian descent
Year of birth missing (living people)
Living people